Volts is an album by AC/DC released as a part named "Disc Four" on the Bonfire box set. Released in November 1997, the album is a compilation of some alternative versions of songs recorded for the albums Let There Be Rock and Highway to Hell, and some songs previously released.

A hidden track containing various interviews appears after a short amount of silence following the last track.

Track listing
 "Dirty Eyes" – 3:21
 "Touch Too Much" (demo) – 6:34
 "If You Want Blood You've Got It" (demo) – 4:28
 "Back Seat Confidential" – 5:23
 "Get It Hot" (demo) – 4:17
 "Sin City" (live) – 4:58
 "She's Got Balls" (live) – 7:57
 "School Days" (Chuck Berry cover) – 5:23
 "It's a Long Way to the Top (If You Wanna Rock 'n' Roll)" – 5:14
 "Ride On" – 5:47 "Bon Scott interviews" – 3:48

Australian version
 "Dirty Eyes" – 3:21
 "Touch Too Much" – 6:34
 "If You Want Blood (You've Got It)" – 4:26
 "Back Seat Confidential" – 5:23
 "Get It Hot" – 4:15
 "Sin City" (live) – 4:53
 "Walk All Over You" (live) - 5:06
 "T.N.T." (live) - 4:13
 "She's Got Balls" (live) – 7:56
 "School Days" – 5:21
 "It's a Long Way to the Top (If You Wanna Rock 'n' Roll)" – 5:16
 "Ride On" – 9:44  "Bon Scott interviews"

 All songs composed by Malcolm Young, Angus Young and Bon Scott except "School Days" by Chuck Berry.

Track information
"Dirty Eyes" is an early recording, which essentially later turned out as the song "Whole Lotta Rosie" which is found on both versions of Let There Be Rock, though with different lyrics.
"Touch Too Much" is a different track from the one found on Highway to Hell, the only similarity being the title.
"If You Want Blood (You've Got It)" is the same track found on Highway to Hell, but with some different lyrics.
"Back Seat Confidential" is an early recording, which essentially turned into the song "Beating Around the Bush", which is found on Highway to Hell, though with different lyrics.
"Get It Hot" is a different track from the one found on Highway to Hell, the only similarity being the title.
"Sin City" was recorded live from Midnight Special on 6 September 1978.
"Walk All Over You" and "T.N.T." were recorded live from Let There Be Rock: The Movie in the Australian version.
"She's Got Balls" was recorded live in 1977 from the Bondi Lifesaver, and is also found as a b-side to the single "You Shook Me All Night Long".
"School Days" is from T.N.T., and was previously unreleased outside of Australia.
"It's a Long Way to the Top (If You Wanna Rock 'n' Roll)" was previously released on T.N.T., in a slightly shorter edit; it also appears on the international version of High Voltage.
"Ride On" was previously released on the Australian and international releases of Dirty Deeds Done Dirt Cheap, and there are several hidden interview tracks after this song.

Personnel
 Bon Scott - lead vocals; bagpipes on "It's A Long Way to the Top"
 Angus Young - lead guitar
 Malcolm Young - rhythm guitar, backing vocals
 Phil Rudd - drums
 Cliff Williams - bass guitar, backing vocals
 Mark Evans - bass guitar on "Dirty Eyes", "It's a Long Way to the Top", and "Ride On"
   George Young - bass guitar on "School Days"

AC/DC compilation albums
1997 compilation albums
East West Records compilation albums
Demo albums
Albums produced by George Young (rock musician)
Albums produced by Harry Vanda